Aegean Numbers is a Unicode block containing punctuation, number, and unit characters for Linear A, Linear B, and the Cypriot syllabary, together Aegean numerals.

History
The following Unicode-related documents record the purpose and process of defining specific characters in the Aegean Numbers block:

References 

Unicode blocks